The Mystery of Heaven is the second collaborative album by Jozef van Wissem & Jim Jarmusch. It was released on Sacred Bones Records in 2012.

The track "The More She Burns the More Beautifully She Glows" features a guest appearance from actress Tilda Swinton.

Reception
Bob Boilen of NPR said: "The album is gritty but not in-your-face; it's pretty, but there's nothing delicate about it. It's a rich, appropriately cinematic sound."

Track listing

References

External links
 
 

Minimal music albums
2012 classical albums
Sacred Bones Records albums